The first USS New England was a whaler purchased by the Union Navy at New London, Connecticut, on 21 November 1861.

New England was used in the "Stone Fleet" as an obstruction at Maffit's Channel, Charleston Harbor, South Carolina, on 25 January 1862.

See also

Union Blockade

References

 

Ships of the Union Navy
Ships of the Stone Fleet
Maritime incidents in January 1862
Scuttled vessels
Shipwrecks of the American Civil War
Shipwrecks of the Carolina coast